Mangelia forcellii is a species of sea snail, a marine gastropod mollusc in the family Mangeliidae.

Description
The length of the shell attains 7 mm.

Distribution
This marine species occurs off Madagascar.

References

 Bozzetti L. (2014) Mangelia forcellii (Gastropoda: Hypsogastropoda: Conidae, Mangeliinae). Nuova specie dal Madagascar Meridionale. Malacologia Mostra Mondiale 82: 4–5

External links
 

forcellii
Gastropods described in 2014